Dimer may refer to:
 Dimer (chemistry), a chemical structure formed from two similar sub-units
 Protein dimer, a protein quaternary structure
 d-dimer
 Dimer model, an item in statistical mechanics, based on domino tiling
 Julius Dimer (1871–1945), German chess master

See also 
 Dimery (botany), having two parts in a distinct whorl of a plant structure
 Di (disambiguation), a prefix
 Dymer (disambiguation)
 -mer, a suffix
 Oligomer
 Peierls transition, sometimes called dimerization